Zoe Carides (born 19 February 1962) is an Australian actress of film and television, who is best known for her roles in Death in Brunswick as Sophie, G. P. as Dr. Sonia Kapek and Grass Roots as Liz Murray.

Family
Carides was born in London, UK.

She has a daughter. Her sister is actress Gia Carides who also appeared in Police Rescue. Her brother-in-law was actor Anthony LaPaglia.

Acting roles
Carides has made cameos in many successful Australian television shows, such as All Saints, Acropolis Now, White Collar Blue, Crownies, Janet King, Rake, and Top of the Lake: China Girl.

Carides appeared in the 1980s advertisement for the State Bank of Victoria where, as she sits in her bed with her partner, she turns and says "it's your money, Ralph". This saying became part of the Australian lexicon for many years with people quoting it when talking about any monetary issue.

Carides' first major role was the 1991 film Death in Brunswick as the love interest of Sam Neill's lead character. She also went on to star in Brilliant Lies, which won her an AFI nomination, The Kiss and Police Rescue. She also starred in the independent Australian production of Beware of Greeks Bearing Guns.

After turning 40, Carides set two goals: to have a solo exhibition of her paintings and to record an album of her own music.

In 2005, Carides starred in the Sydney Theatre Company's Influence, by David Williamson, for which she won a Helpmann Award. In 2008, she played the part of Pia Jones in the BBC-commissioned Australian soap opera Out of the Blue.

She has also directed two short films: Gifted in 2005, and Not even a Mouse in 2011.

In 2015, Carides appeared in the film Alex & Eve, which was based on the Australian play by Alex Lykos. She plays Chloe, the mother of Greek Alex (played by Richard Brancatisano), who falls in love with Muslim Lebanese Eve (played by Andrea Demetriades).

She released an album of self-written songs, When I was Little, in 2018.

Filmography

References

External links
 
Clip from Death in Brunswick from the National Sound and Film Archives

Australian people of Greek descent
Australian people of English descent
Australian film actresses
Australian television actresses
Helpmann Award winners
1962 births
Living people
Actresses from Sydney